Lipit-Ishtar (Akkadian: Lipit-Ištar; fl. c. 1870 BC – c. 1860 BC by the short chronology of the ancient near east) was the 5th king of the First Dynasty of Isin, according to the Sumerian King List (SKL). Also according to the SKL: he was the successor of Išme-Dagān. Ur-Ninurta then succeeded Lipit-Ištar. Some documents and royal inscriptions from his time have survived, however; Lipit-Ištar is mostly known due to the Sumerian language hymns that were written in his honor, as well as a legal code written in his name (preceding the famed Code of Hammurabi by about 100 years)—which were used for school instruction for hundreds of years after Lipit-Ištar's death. The annals of Lipit-Ištar's reign recorded that he also repulsed the Amorites.

Excerpts from the "Code of Lipit-Ištar"

The text exists on several partial fragments. The following complete laws have been reconstructed:

§8 If a man gave bare ground to another man to set out as an orchard and the latter did not complete setting out that bare ground as an orchard, he shall give to the man who set out the orchard the bare ground which he neglected as part of his share.

§9 If a man entered the orchard of another man and was seized there for stealing, he shall pay ten shekels of silver.

§10 If a man cut down a tree in the garden of another man, he shall pay one-half mina of silver.

§11 If adjacent to the house of a man the bare ground of another man has been neglected and the owner of the house has said to the owner of the bare ground, "Because your ground has been neglected someone may break into my house: strengthen your house," and this agreement has been confirmed by him, the owner of the bare ground shall restore to the owner of the house any of his property that is lost.

§12 If a slave-girl or slave of a man has fled into the heart of the city and it has been confirmed that he (or she) dwelt in the house of (another) man for one month, he shall give slave for slave.

§13  If he has no slave, he shall pay fifteen shekels of silver.

§14 If a man's slave has compensated his slave-ship to his master and it is confirmed (that he has compensated) his master two-fold, that slave shall be freed.

§15 If a miqtum [servant] is the grant of a king, he shall not be taken away.

§16 If a miqtum went to a man of his own free will, that man shall not hold him; he (the miqtum) may go where he desires.

§17 If a man without authorization bound another man to a matter of which he (the latter) had no knowledge, that man is not affirmed (i.e., legally obligated); he (the first man) shall bear the penalty in regard to the matter to which he had bound him.

§18 If the master of an estate or the mistress of an estate has defaulted on the tax of an estate and a stranger has borne it, for three years he (the owner) may not be evicted. Afterwards, the man who bore the tax of the estate shall possess that estate and the former owner of the estate shall not raise any claim.

§22 If the father is living, his daughter whether she be a high priestess, a priestess, or a hierodule shall dwell in his house like an heir.

§24 If the second wife whom he had married bore him children, the dowry which she brought from her father's house belongs to her children but the children of his first wife and the children of his second wife shall divide equally the property of their father.

§25 If a man married his wife and she bore him children and those children are living, and a slave also bore children for her master but the father granted freedom to the slave and her children, the children of the slave shall not divide the estate with the children of their former master.

§27 If a man's wife has not borne him children but a harlot from the public square has borne him children, he shall provide grain, oil and clothing for that harlot. The children which the harlot has borne him shall be his heirs, and as long as his wife lives the harlot shall not live in the house with the wife.

§29 If a son-in-law has entered the house of his (prospective) father-in-law and afterwards they made him go out (of the house) and gave his wife to his companion, they shall present to him the betrothal gifts which he brought and that wife may not marry his companion.

§34 If a man rented an ox and injured the flesh at the nose ring, he shall pay one-third of its price.

§35 If a man rented an ox and damaged its eye, he shall pay one-half its price.

§36 If a man rented an ox and broke its horn, he shall pay one-fourth its price.

§37 If a man rented an ox and damaged its tail, he shall pay one-fourth its price.

See also

 Isin
 Sumer
 Amorites
 Cuneiform law
 History of Sumer
 Sumerian people

Notes

References
 James R. Court, Codex Collections from Mesopotamia and Asia Minor. Scholars Press, 1995.
 Francis R. Steele, The Code of Lipit Ishtar - University of Pennsylvania Museum Monographs, 1948 - includes complete text and analysis of all fragments [reprinted from American Journal of Archaeology 52 (1948)]

Sumerian kings
Amorite kings
Ancient legislators
Ancient Near East law
19th-century BC Sumerian kings
Dynasty of Isin